Imelda Mary Philomena Bernadette Staunton  (born 9 January 1956) is an English actress and singer. After training at the Royal Academy of Dramatic Art, Staunton began her career in repertory theatre in 1976 and appeared in various theatre productions in the United Kingdom. 

Staunton has performed in a variety of plays and musicals in London throughout her career, winning four Laurence Olivier Awards; three for Best Actress in a Leading Role in a Musical for her roles in the musicals Into the Woods, Sweeney Todd, and Gypsy, and one for Best Performance in a Supporting Role in a Play for her work in both A Chorus of Disapproval and The Corn Is Green. Her other stage appearances include The Beggar's Opera, The Wizard of Oz, Uncle Vanya, Guys and Dolls, Entertaining Mr Sloane, and Good People. She has been nominated for 13 Olivier Awards.

On film, Staunton's roles in the 1990s include Antonia and Jane, Peter's Friends, Much Ado About Nothing, Sense and Sensibility, and Shakespeare in Love. She received the BAFTA Award for Best Actress in a Leading Role for playing the title role of Vera Drake. She gained a wider audience for her role as Dolores Umbridge in the Harry Potter films The Order of the Phoenix and The Deathly Hallows - Part 1. She also appeared in the films Nanny McPhee, Another Year, Pride, Finding Your Feet, and Downton Abbey, and provided voice roles for Chicken Run, Arthur Christmas, and Paddington.

On television, Staunton starred in the sitcoms Up the Garden Path and Is it Legal?. Her performance in My Family and Other Animals earned her a nomination for the International Emmy Award for Best Actress, while her roles in Return to Cranford and The Girl earned her BAFTA TV Award nominations for Best Actress in a Supporting Role. For the latter, she was also nominated for the Primetime Emmy Award for Outstanding Supporting Actress in a Miniseries or a Movie. She portrays Queen Elizabeth II in the final two seasons of The Crown, gaining a nomination for a Golden Globe Award for Best Actress.

Early life and education 
Staunton was born in Archway, North London, the only child of Bridie (née McNicholas), a hairdresser, and Joseph Staunton, a labourer. They lived over Staunton's mother's salon. Her parents were first-generation Catholic immigrants from County Mayo, Ireland; her father from Ballyvary and her mother from Bohola. Her mother was a musician who could not read music, but could play almost any tune by ear on the accordion or fiddle, and had played in Irish showbands.

As a pupil at La Sainte Convent, Staunton took drama classes with her elocution teacher and starred in school plays, including the role of Polly Peachum in The Beggar's Opera. Encouraged by her teacher, she auditioned for drama schools and got into the Royal Academy of Dramatic Art (RADA) at age 18. She also unsuccessfully auditioned for the Central School of Speech and Drama and Guildhall School of Music and Drama.

Acting career

Theatre
Staunton graduated from RADA in 1976, then spent six years in English repertory theatre, including a period at the Northcott Theatre, Exeter, where she had the title role in Shaw's Saint Joan (1979). She then moved on to roles the National Theatre, including Lucy Lockit in The Beggar's Opera (1982), which earned her Olivier Award nominations for Best Actress in a Leading Role in a Musical and Most Promising Newcomer of the Year in Theatre. She also appeared in two revivals of Guys and Dolls at the National Theatre; the first in 1982 in which she met her husband Jim Carter and the second in 1996 in which she played Miss Adelaide and was nominated for the Olivier Award for Best Actress in a Musical.

In 1985, Staunton won her first Laurence Olivier Award for Best Performance in a Supporting Role for her work in both The Corn Is Green and at The Old Vic and A Chorus of Disapproval at the National Theatre. She also played Dorothy Gale in the Royal Shakespeare Company's 1987 revival of The Wizard of Oz at the Barbican Centre, which earned her another Olivier nomination for Best Actress in a Musical. Staunton won her first Laurence Olivier Award for Best Actress in a Musical for playing the Baker's Wife in the original London production of Into the Woods (1990).

In the ensuing 20 years, Staunton mainly had roles in plays, including Sonya in Uncle Vanya (1988), Kath in Entertaining Mr Sloane (2009) and  Good People (2014), for which she received Olivier nominations for Best Actress in a Play. She also appeared in two productions at the Almeida Theatre, firstly in the premiere of Frank McGuinness's There Came a Gypsy Riding in 2007 and secondly in a revival of Edward Albee's A Delicate Balance in 2011.

Most recently, Staunton has appeared in two Chichester Festival Theatre productions, taking on the role of Mrs. Lovett in a revival of Stephen Sondheim's Sweeney Todd between 2011 and 2012, starring opposite Michael Ball, before starring as Rose in a revival of Gypsy between 2014 and 2015. Both productions transferred to London for critically and commercially acclaimed runs. Staunton won her second and third Olivier Awards for Best Actress in a Musical for the two productions in 2013 and 2016 respectively.

Staunton returned to the Harold Pinter Theatre in London West End in 2017 as Martha in Who's Afraid of Virginia Woolf?, starring alongside Conleth Hill, Luke Treadaway and Imogen Poots at the Harold Pinter Theatre. This play was broadcast in National Theatre Live on 18 May 2017.

Staunton performed the role of Sally in the 2017 National Theatre revival of Stephen Sondheim's Follies, alongside Janie Dee as Phyllis, and Philip Quast as Ben. The show was broadcast through the National Theatre Live initiative on 16 November 2017.

Film

Staunton's first big-screen role came in a 1986 film Comrades. She then appeared in the 1991 film Antonia and Jane, and in the 1992 film Peter's Friends. Other film roles include performances in Much Ado About Nothing (1993), Deadly Advice (1993), Sense and Sensibility (1995) Twelfth Night (1996), Chicken Run (2000), Another Life (2001), Bright Young Things (2003), Nanny McPhee (2005), Freedom Writers (2007) and How About You (2007).

Staunton shared a Screen Actors Guild Award for Best Performance by a Cast in 1998 for Shakespeare in Love. In 2004, she received the Best Actress honours at the European Film Awards, the BAFTAs, and the Venice Film Festival for her performance of the title role in Mike Leigh's Vera Drake, which also won Best Picture. For the same role, she received her first nomination for the Academy Award for Best Actress, the Golden Globe Award for Best Actress – Motion Picture Drama and the Screen Actors Guild Award for Outstanding Performance by a Female Actor in a Leading Role.

Staunton portrayed Dolores Umbridge in Harry Potter and the Order of the Phoenix (2007), a performance described as "coming close to stealing the show". She was nominated in the "British Actress in a Supporting Role" category at the London Film Critics Circle Awards. Staunton reprised her role as Dolores Umbridge in Harry Potter and the Deathly Hallows – Part 1 in 2010.

Other film roles include the 2008 movie A Bunch of Amateurs, in which she starred alongside Burt Reynolds, Derek Jacobi and Samantha Bond, and the character of Sonia Teichberg in Ang Lee's Taking Woodstock (2009). Staunton provided the voice of the Talking Flowers in Tim Burton's Alice in Wonderland (2010), and played one of the lead roles in the ghost film The Awakening in 2011. In 2012, she voiced Queen Victoria in the Aardman film The Pirates! Band of Misfits, where she serves as the main antagonist.  In 2014, she co-starred in Maleficent as well as the British comedy-drama Pride.

In late 2014, she had a voice role in Paddington, a film based on the Paddington Bear books by Michael Bond. Staunton and her Harry Potter co-star Michael Gambon voiced Paddington's Aunt Lucy and Uncle Pastuzo, respectively.

An August 2018 announcement revealed that Staunton would be among the new cast to join the original actors in Downton Abbey which started principal photography at about the same time.

Television work

In 1993, she appeared on television alongside Richard Briers and Adrian Edmondson in If You See God, Tell Him. Staunton also played the wife of Detective Burakov in the 1995 HBO movie, Citizen X, which recounted the pursuit and capture of Russian serial killer Andrei Chikatilo. She has had other television parts in The Singing Detective (1986), Midsomer Murders, and the sitcom Is It Legal? (1995–98), as well as A Bit of Fry and Laurie. She was a voice artist on Mole's Christmas (1994). She had a guest role playing Mrs. Mead in Little Britain in 2005, and in 2007 played the free-thinking gossip, Miss Pole, in Cranford, the five-part BBC series based on Mrs Gaskell's novels. In 2011, she played Grace Andrews in the second series of Psychoville.

In 2011, she was the Voice of the Interface in the highly acclaimed and nominee for the Hugo Award for Best Dramatic Presentation (Short Form) episode of Doctor Who – "The Girl Who Waited". In 2012, she portrayed Alma Reville, the wife of Alfred Hitchcock, in the HBO television movie The Girl, which also starred Toby Jones and Sienna Miller. Her performance saw her nominated for a BAFTA Television Award and a Primetime Emmy Award.

Since May 2020, Staunton stars in the Apple TV+ comedy series Trying. The first season premiered on 1 May 2020 and the second-season premieres on 14 May 2021, with the show already renewed for a third season. On 31 January 2020, it was announced that she would be portraying Queen Elizabeth II in the fifth season of the critically acclaimed Netflix series The Crown. On 9 July 2020, it was announced that the series had been extended to a sixth and final season, with Staunton again to reprise her role of the Queen. Staunton's performance in the fifth season earned her a nomination for the Golden Globe Award for Best Actress – Television Series Drama.

Radio
On radio, she has appeared in the title role of the detective drama series Julie Enfield Investigates, as the lead "Izzy Comyn" in the comedy Up the Garden Path (which later moved to ITV with Staunton reprising the role), in Diary of a Provincial Lady (from 1999), as "Courageous Kate" in Series 1 of Elephants to Catch Eels and as "Xanthippe" in Series 2 of Acropolis Now.

She starred opposite Anna Massey in the post-World War II mystery series Daunt and Dervish, and opposite Patrick Barlow in The Patrick and Maureen Maybe Music Experience. She played the role of a schoolboy as the lead character in the five part (15 minutes each): "The Skool Days of Nigel Molesworth" for BBC Radio 4.

Other work
Staunton has narrated unabridged audio-book versions of many of Julia Donaldson's children's books, including The Gruffalo, The Gruffalo's Child, Monkey Puzzle, The Snail and the Whale, Stick Man and Zog, as well as other children's books. In 2014 she collaborated with her husband, Jim Carter, and Show of Hands on Centenary: Words and Music of the Great War, an album of songs and poetry from and inspired by World War I.

Staunton is also a patron for the Milton Rooms, a new arts centre in Malton, North Yorkshire along with Bill Nighy, Jools Holland and Kathy Burke.

Personal life
Staunton and her husband, English actor Jim Carter, have a daughter, Bessie, born in 1993. In 2007, they appeared in the BBC series Cranford, with Carter as Captain Brown and Bessie as a maid. They live in West Hampstead.

In 2014, Staunton's dog, Molly, appeared as Chowsie the dog in Gypsy at the Chichester Festival Theatre from 6 October to 8 November. Staunton played the leading role of Mama Rose.

Honours
Staunton was appointed Officer of the Order of the British Empire (OBE) in the 2006 New Year Honours and Commander of the Order of the British Empire (CBE) in the 2016 New Year Honours, both for services to drama.

Acting credits

Film

Television

Theatre

Accolades

Discography
 1990: Into the Woods – Original London Cast; as baker's wife.
 2010: Julia Donaldson Audio Collection; as the narrator of the Gruffalo, The Gruffalo's Child, and Charlie Cook's Favourite Book.
 2012: Sweeney Todd – Revival Cast Recording; as Mrs. Lovett.
 2015: Gypsy – London Cast Recording; as Momma Rose.
 2019: Follies – London Cast Recording; as Sally.

See also
List of British Academy Award nominees and winners
List of actors with Academy Award nominations

Notes

References

External links
 
 The Prime of Miss Imelda Staunton, Sunday Telegraph interview 15 July 2007
 
 The Telegraph: Imelda Staunton interview
 Imelda Staunton in Conversation, filmed BAFTA event, March 2009

1956 births
Living people
20th-century English actresses
21st-century English actresses
Actresses from London
British people of Irish descent
Alumni of RADA
Audiobook narrators
Best Actress BAFTA Award winners
Commanders of the Order of the British Empire
English film actresses
English musical theatre actresses
English people of Irish descent
English radio actresses
English Shakespearean actresses
English stage actresses
English television actresses
English voice actresses
European Film Award for Best Actress winners
Laurence Olivier Award winners
Outstanding Performance by a Cast in a Motion Picture Screen Actors Guild Award winners
People from Archway, London
Royal Shakespeare Company members
Volpi Cup for Best Actress winners